Jokūbas is a Lithuanian masculine given name. It is a cognate of the given names Jacob and James and may refer to:
Edvardas Jokūbas Daukša (1836–1890), Lithuanian poet, translator, participant of 1863 Uprising
Jokūbas Gintvainis (born 1994), Lithuanian basketball player
Jokūbas Minkevičius (1921–1996), Lithuanian politician
Jokūbas Šernas (1888–1926), Lithuanian attorney, journalist, teacher, and banker
Jokūbas Smuškevičius (1902–1941), Soviet-Lithuanian Commander of the Soviet Air Force
Jokūbas Vygodskis (aka, Jakub Wygodzki) (1856–1941),  Polish–Lithuanian Jewish politician, Zionist activist, and a medical doctor

References

Lithuanian masculine given names